Alleghany Springs Springhouse is a historic spring house located on the former grounds of Alleghany Springs, at Alleghany Springs, Montgomery County, Virginia.  It was built about 1890, and is a two-tier, rustic, hip-roofed, octagonal pavilion. The structure is supported on rough cedar posts with complex intertwined knots of rhododendron branches and roots forming brackets, railings, and even vaulted "ceilings."  At the center of the structure is the Alleghany Spring, that has been blocked.

It was listed on the National Register of Historic Places in 1989.

References

Agricultural buildings and structures on the National Register of Historic Places in Virginia
Buildings and structures completed in 1890
Buildings and structures in Montgomery County, Virginia
National Register of Historic Places in Montgomery County, Virginia
Spring houses